Elachista hiranoi is a moth in the family Elachistidae. It was described by Sugisima in 2005. It is found in Japan (Kyushu, Honshu).

The length of the forewings is 3.5–4.3 mm for males and 3.4–4.1 mm for females. The forewings are blackish, with silvery markings. Adults have been recorded on wing in late June and early July, probably in one generation per year.

Etymology
The species is named for Mr Nagao Hirano, who provided specimens of this species to the author.

References

Moths described in 2005
hiranoi
Moths of Japan